The Night of the Hunter is a 1953 thriller novel by American author Davis Grubb. The book was a national bestseller and a finalist for the 1955 National Book Award.

Story line and development
Murderous ex-convict Harry Powell misrepresents himself as a prison chaplain upon his release from prison.  Acting on a story told to him by his now-dead cellmate, "Reverend" Powell cons the cellmate's widow, Willa Harper, into marrying him in hopes that her children will tell him where their father hid the money from his last robbery. After killing their mother, he embarks on a hunt for the children, who have sensed his evil and are running from him.

Grubb explores the presentation of the American South during the Great Depression. He uses tropes of the Southern Gothic genre to explore issues such as social corruption and instability.

Inspiration
The plot was based on the true story of Harry Powers, who was hanged in 1932 for the murders of two widows and three children in Quiet Dell, West Virginia.

Editions 

 Harper Brothers, 1953.
 Dell Publishing, 1955. #D149.
 Dell Publishing, 1963. #6386.
 Penguin Books, 1977. 
 Simon & Schuster, 1988. 
 Lightyear Press, 1993. 
 Blackmask.com, 2005.

Screen and stage adaptations 

In 1955, the book was adapted by Charles Laughton and James Agee as the film The Night of the Hunter.  The film version has earned ranks in numerous movie lists and was added to the National Film Registry in 1992. Despite its critical success, The Night of the Hunter remained the only film ever directed by Laughton.

Lyricist-librettist Stephen Cole and composer Claibe Richardson started working on a musical adaptation sometime in the late 1990s, releasing a concept album in 1998 through the Fynsworth Alley label.  Cole wrote preliminary forms of the book and lyrics, which earned him the 2000 Kleban Award for Most Promising Librettist, while Richardson composed a score.  After going through a workshop revision phase, the show was premiered at the Willow's Theatre in Concord, California, on September 24, 2004.  It was directed and produced by John Bowab, and starred Brian Noonan (from the original workshop cast) as Harry Powell and Lynne Wintersteller as Willa.  The show received mixed reviews, but received four awards from the Bay Area Critics Circle.  
The show moved on to the New York Musical Theatre Festival in 2006, the last performance being on October 1.  The cast included Brian Noonan, Carly Rose Sonenclar, Dee Hoty as Willa, Beth Fowler as Rachel Cooper, and others, some of whom were in the original workshops.

See also 
 Lonely hearts killer

References

Bibliography 
 Heaven & Hell to Play With: The Filming of 'The Night of the Hunter' by Preston Neal Jones. New York: Limelight Editions, 2002. In this well-detailed behind-the-scenes look at the film, Jones interviewed many of the principals, including Davis Grubb, producer Paul Gregory, cinematographer Stanley Cortez, art director Hilyard Brown, and actors Robert Mitchum, Don Beddoe, and Lillian Gish. He also relied upon extensive interviews with Charles Laughton conducted by others.

1953 American novels
Novels by Davis Grubb
American thriller novels
American novels adapted into films
Musicals based on novels
Novels about serial killers
Southern Gothic novels
Novels set in West Virginia
Great Depression novels
Harper & Brothers books
Uxoricide in fiction